Aisling Ní Dhonnchadha is an Irish scholar and academic who previously lectured in the Department of Modern Irish in Maynooth University.

Selected bibliography
 Cnuasach Comhar 1982-2012: Ailt, Aistí, Agallaimh, 2014
 Ar an gCoigríoch: Díolaim Litríochta ar Scéal na hImirce (with Máirín Nic Eoin), Cló Iar-Chonnachta, 2008
 Léachtaí Cholm Cille XXXVI: An Prós Comhaimseartha (editor), An Sagart, 2006
 Idir dhúchas agus dualgas : staidéar ar charachtair mhná sa ghearrscéal Gaelige 1940-1990, An Clóchomhar, 2002
 Gearrscéalta an Chéid, with G. Denvir, Cló Iar-Chonnachta, 2000

External links
 https://www.maynoothuniversity.ie/people/aisling-n-dhonnchadha
 https://www.abebooks.co.uk/book-search/author/aisling-ni-dhonnchadha/
 https://www.overdrive.com/creators/604168/aisling-ni-dhonnchadha
 https://portraidi.ie/ga/aisling-ni-dhonnchadha/

20th-century Irish people
21st-century Irish people
People from County Tipperary
People from County Dublin
Irish-language writers
Living people
Year of birth missing (living people)
Academics of Maynooth University